Nikolai Nikolayevich Kashentsev (born 19 July 1974) is a Russian professional football coach and a former player. He is an assistant coach of FC Khimik Dzerzhinsk.

Club career
He made his professional debut in the Soviet Second League in 1991 for FC Dynamo Barnaul. He played 5 games in the UEFA Intertoto Cup 1997 for FC Lokomotiv Nizhny Novgorod.

Personal life
He is a brother of Yevgeni Kashentsev.

References

1974 births
Sportspeople from Barnaul
Living people
Soviet footballers
Association football midfielders
Association football defenders
Russian footballers
FC Dynamo Barnaul players
FC Lokomotiv Nizhny Novgorod players
FC Zhemchuzhina Sochi players
FC Mordovia Saransk players
Buxoro FK players
Russian Premier League players
Russian expatriate footballers
Expatriate footballers in Uzbekistan
Russian expatriate sportspeople in Uzbekistan
Russian football managers